William Brown Keen (August 16, 1892 – July 16, 1947), nicknamed "Hammerhead", was a first baseman in Major League Baseball. He played for the Pittsburgh Pirates in 1911.

References

External links

1892 births
1947 deaths
Major League Baseball first basemen
Pittsburgh Pirates players
Indianapolis Indians players
Baseball players from Georgia (U.S. state)
People from Oglethorpe, Georgia
Clarksville Volunteers players